Happy Sardar is a 2019 Indian Malayalam-language romantic comedy-drama film co-written and directed by debutant directorial duo Sudip Joshy and Geethika Sudip. An Indian remake of the French film Serial (Bad) Weddings, it is the first Malayalam film directed by a couple.

Synopsis
Happy Singh (Kalidas Jayaram) is a happy-go-lucky young man who was born to a Punjabi father Inderpal Singh (Javed Jaffrey) and a Malayali mother Annamma (Praveena). He falls in love with Mary Kochara, the youngest daughter of Joyce Kochara (Siddique) and Reetha Kochara (Maala Parvathi).

Happy Sardar narrates how Happy and Mary win over each other's parents and get married with their blessings.

Cast
 
 Kalidas Jayaram as Harvinder "Happy" Singh
 Merin Philip as Mary Kochara / Mary Harvinder Singh
 Javed Jaffrey as Inderpal Singh, Happy's father
 Praveena as Annamma, Happy's mother
 Siddique as Joyce Kochara, Mary's father
 Maala Parvathi as Reetha Kochara, Mary's mother
 Zinil Sainudeen as Jithendra Varma
 Chippy Devassy as Jeena Kochra / Jeena Jithendra Varma
 Balu Varghese as Iqbaal Moos
 Akhila Mohan as Sophie Kochara / Sophie Iqbaal
 Sebastian Sebooty as Adv. Rendev
 Sithara Vijayan as Annie Kochara / Annie Rendev
 Sharaf U Dheen as Kaakku, Mary's family friend
 Siddhi Mahajankatti as Pammi Kaur, Mary's friend, Happy's family friend and Sharaff's wife 
 Sreenath Bhasi as Sharaff, Happy's friend and Pammi's husband 
 Baiju Santhosh as Happy's uncle
 Sibi Thomas as Happy's uncle
 Anoop Chandran as Father Bernard Idikkula
 Vijilesh Karayad
 Sajan Palluruthy
 Dinesh Mohan as Joginder Singh, Pammi's father
 Anjo Nair as Mrs. Joginder, Pammi's mother
 Surabhi Santosh as herself (cameo appearance)

Production

Casting

In February 2019, it was reported that Kalidas Jayaram will be playing the male lead along with Bollywood actor Javed Jaffrey in an important role. On 16 February, Jaffrey was confirmed to be playing Kalidas's father with Merin Philip as the female lead. Merin was previously seen in Poomaram starring Kalidas in a supporting role. Kalidas joined the sets in Patiala in March 2019. Times of India reported on 19 September that Kalidas, playing a Sikh character will have Aanandam fame Siddhi Mahajankatti as the female lead.

References

External links
 

2019 films
2010s Malayalam-language films